Victoria Agbodobiri (from Edo state) is a Nigerian judoka who competes in the women's category. She won a bronze medal at the 2011 All-Africa Games, in the category U52kg.

Sports career 
Victoria participated in the 2011 All-Africa Games held in Maputo, Mozambique. At the event, she won a bronze medal, in the women's 52kg event.

References 

Living people
Nigerian female judoka
Year of birth missing (living people)
African Games medalists in judo
African Games bronze medalists for Nigeria
Competitors at the 2011 All-Africa Games
21st-century Nigerian women